Distorted Lullabies is the band Ours' first official album. Released on the Dreamworks label on May 15, 2001, it is largely composed of melodic rock songs. The single "Sometimes" found moderate success with MTV and many modern rock radio stations.

Track listing
"Fallen Souls"
"Drowning"
"I'm a Monster"
"Sometimes"
"Miseryhead"
"Here Is the Light"
"Medication"
"Dancing Alone"
"Bleed"
"Dizzy"
"Meet Me in the Tower"
"As I Wander"

References

2001 albums
Ours (band) albums
DreamWorks Records albums
Albums produced by Steve Lillywhite